Eva Lazzaro is an Australian actress.  She is perhaps best known for her roles as Caylin-Calandria in the 2006 film Jindabyne and Stacey in the 2009 film Blessed.

Biography
Her first role was a guest spot in the television series Blue Heelers in 2002. She has also had minor parts in Underbelly and Nightmares and Dreamscapes. She has a main role as Gigi Kovac in the drama Tangle and a recurring role as Zoe in the children's show The Elephant Princess. Lazzaro has been nominated for a 2010 TV Week Logie Award, for a Graham Kennedy Award for Outstanding New Talent, and also for an ASTRA award in a similar category.

Lazzaro debuted as a director with the short film Alice's Baby, based on her own experience with her mother's miscarriage. The film's entrance into Tropfest saw her become the youngest female finalist at the festival.

Filmography

Film

Television

References

Further reading

External links

1995 births
Living people
21st-century Australian actresses
Actresses from Melbourne
Australian child actresses
Australian film actresses
Australian television actresses